The Huntersville Formation is a geologic formation in Virginia, United States. It preserves fossils dating back to the Devonian period.

See also

 List of fossiliferous stratigraphic units in Virginia
 Paleontology in Virginia

References
 

Devonian geology of Virginia
Devonian southern paleotemperate deposits